Vladimir "Vlada" Pejović (born 6 April 1950) is a Serbian former football manager and player.

Playing career
Born in Belgrade, Pejović started out at Partizan, making his debut in the 1967–68 season. He would make a total of 168 league appearances for the club over the next decade. In 1978, Pejović signed with Yugoslav Second League side Galenika Zemun.

Managerial career
After starting his managerial career at Zemun, Pejović moved abroad to Malta and worked with several clubs, including Birkirkara.

Honours
Partizan
 Yugoslav First League: 1975–76, 1977–78
 Mitropa Cup: 1977–78
Galenika Zemun
 Yugoslav Second League: 1981–82

References

External links
 

1950 births
Living people
Footballers from Belgrade
Yugoslav footballers
Serbian footballers
Association football defenders
FK Partizan players
FK Zemun players
Yugoslav First League players
Yugoslav Second League players
Yugoslav football managers
Serbia and Montenegro football managers
Serbian football managers
FK Zemun managers
Floriana F.C. managers
Birkirkara F.C. managers
Sliema Wanderers F.C. managers
Maltese Premier League managers
Serbia and Montenegro expatriate football managers
Expatriate football managers in Malta
Serbia and Montenegro expatriate sportspeople in Malta